The Towson Post Office at 101 West Chesapeake Avenue in Towson, Maryland, was completed in 1937.  It is a two-story, limestone building, that is lightly styled in a Neo-Classical fashion.  Formally the body of the building consists of three bays where the larger central portion projects slightly.  The roof is a low gable topped by a modest central cupola.  The lobby contains a transportation themed Works Progress Administration mural by Nicolai Cikovski.  The mural drew considerable attention and criticism in the local press when it was completed in June 1938.  The artist was a Russian emigre and an instructor at the Corcoran Gallery in Washington.

References

Maryland Historical Trust Search BA-1437

Buildings and structures in Baltimore County, Maryland
Government buildings completed in 1937
Works Progress Administration in Maryland